La Voix is the Quebec version of the TV reality show The Voice.

La Voix (the voice in French) may also refer to:

Film and television
The Voice (French TV series), the French television version of The Voice
The Voice (1992 film), a French film directed by Pierre Granier-Deferre

Media / Press
La Voix de l'Est (Bagnolet), a Communist Party local weekly published from Bagnolet, France
La Voix de l'Est (Granby), a French-language daily published in Granby, Quebec
La Voix des Belges, a bi-monthly clandestine newspaper published by the Belgian Belgian National Movement
La Voix des Femmes (France, 1848), a French feminist periodical
La Voix des femmes (France, 1917), a French feminist periodical
La Voix du Luxembourg, a French-language daily newspaper published in Luxembourg
La Voix du Nord (daily), a French regional daily in Lille, France

Music
"La Voix" (song), a 2009 Swedish Eurovision song by Malena Ernman
La voix du bon Dieu, a French album by French-Canadian singer Céline Dion
"La voix du bon Dieu" (song), from the album

See also
 Lavoie
 The Voice (disambiguation)
 La Voz (disambiguation)